Blood Lines: Long and Short Stories is a 1995 short story collection by British writer Ruth Rendell.

Contents 

The volume contains 9 short stories and 2 longer novellas:
 Blood Lines (novella - Inspector Wexford)
 Lizzie's Lover
 Shreds and Slivers
 Burning End
 The Man Who Was The God Of Love
 The Carer
 Expectations
 Clothes
 Unacceptable Levels
 In All Honesty
 The Strawberry Tree (novella)

References

External links
 Blood Lines on Internet Archive
 Blood Lines: Long and Short Stories on Goodreads

1995 short story collections
Short story collections by Ruth Rendell
Hutchinson (publisher) books
Inspector Wexford series